In Filipino cuisine, moron (also spelled morón or muron, the stress is placed on the last syllable) is a rice cake similar to suman. It is a native delicacy of the Waray people in the Eastern Visayas region of the Philippines, particularly in the area around Tacloban City in the province of Leyte and in Eastern Samar province. Other parts of the Philippines have their versions of it, however. In fact, the moron was adopted as one of Mambajao, Camiguin's locally produced products.

Since it is a variety of suman, the moron is cooked with glutinous rice, coconut milk and sugar. The main difference is that moron is gyrated with chocolate tablea (tablets) or mixed with cocoa powder while a regular suman is not. It also has a hint of vanilla and is usually partnered with coffee or sikwate (a native Philippine chocolate drink). With chocolate as its distinct ingredient, it is also called chocolate moron or chocolate suman.

Preparation 
The common ingredients of moron consist of glutinous rice (locally known in Tagalog as malagkit and in the Eastern Visayas region as pilit), ordinary rice, coconut milk, sugar, chocolate or cocoa powder and melted butter. In preparation for cooking the malagkit and the ordinary rice, both rice types must be soaked together overnight and then ground the following day.  The ground rice is then soaked in coconut milk until it is soft, after which sugar and chocolate powder are added. The mixture is cooked over low fire while repeatedly stirred. When the consistency is thick, the cooked mixture is set aside for it to cool.

After the mixture cools, banana leaves are prepared and cut to be used as wrappers.  The recommended amount is two tablespoons of the mixture per banana leaf. The moron is then brushed with butter.  After wrapping, both ends of the banana leaf are tied with string.  Lastly, the moron are steamed for about half an hour.  After the moron is cooled, it can now be served.

Consumption 
Moron is usually sold in bundles of four pieces that are individually wrapped in a banana leaf. Tourists from Leyte usually buy moron as a pasalubong or gift for their relatives and friends.  In the places where moron originated, it is usually served at festivals, birthday parties, and funeral wakes.  Visitors from those parties usually takes home some of the moron. The food is also a medium of exchange for goodwill in Tacloban and the nearby municipalities of Palo, Tanauan, Tolosa, Dulag, Mayorga and Abuyog.

Philippine government agencies usually promote and support locally produced goods such as the moron.  The Department of Science and Technology of the Philippines advocated the longer shelf life of food products including the moron to help producers of those kind of food products while the Department of Trade and Industry of the Philippines conducted trade fairs to develop and promote products, which included the moron.  The Department of Labor and Employment of the Philippines meanwhile made a project in Mambujao, Camiguin for the production of moron.

See also
Binagol
 Moron (psychology)

References 

Philippine rice dishes
Foods containing coconut
Philippine desserts
Glutinous rice dishes
Steamed foods
Rice cakes